Lahiru Sri Lakmal (born 5 May 1989) is a Sri Lankan cricketer. He made his first-class debut for Bloomfield Cricket and Athletic Club in the 2009–10 Premier Trophy on 27 November 2009.

References

External links
 

1989 births
Living people
Sri Lankan cricketers
Tincomalee District cricketers
Bloomfield Cricket and Athletic Club cricketers
Cricketers from Colombo